Mari Törőcsik (born Marián Törőcsik; 23 November 1935 – 16 April 2021) was a Hungarian stage and film actress. She appeared in more than 170 films from 1956 to 2020. She won the award for Best Actress at the 1976 Cannes Film Festival for the film Mrs. Dery Where Are You?

She died in 2021, aged 85. As per her instructions in her will, her body was cremated and the ashes were scattered in the Tisza.

Selected filmography

 Merry-Go-Round (1956)
 Two Confessions (1957)
 Iron Flower (1958)
 St. Peter's Umbrella (1958)
 Édes Anna (1959)
 Drama of the Lark (1963)
 Silence and Cry (1968)
 The Boys of Paul Street (1969)
 Those Who Wear Glasses (1969)
 Love (1971)
 Trotta (1971)
 Cats' Play (1972)
 Electra, My Love (1974)
 Mrs. Dery Where Are You? (1975)
 Forbidden Relations (1983)
 My First Two Hundred Years (1985)
 Music Box (1989)
 The Summer Guest (1992)
 Whoops (1993)
 The Outpost (1995, voice only)
 Long Twilight (1997)
 Sunshine (1999)
 A Long Weekend in Pest and Buda (2003)
 Adventure (2011)

References

External links
 

1935 births
2021 deaths
20th-century Hungarian actresses
21st-century Hungarian actresses
Hungarian film actresses
People from Heves County
Cannes Film Festival Award for Best Actress winners